Alexander Gordon, Lord Rockville (1739 – 13 March 1792) was a Scottish judge.

Life

Rockville was the youngest son of William Gordon, 2nd Earl of Aberdeen, by his third wife Lady Anne, daughter of Alexander Gordon, 2nd Duke of Gordon. 

He became an advocate 7 August 1759 and served as Sheriff of Kirkcudbright from 1764 to 1784. He was appointed a Lord of Session in 1784, filling the position vacated by the death of David Dalrymple, Lord Westhall and took the judicial title of Lord Rockville after the name of his home in Haddington. He became a Senator in 1788.

He died on 13 March 1792 and is buried in St Cuthbert's churchyard in Edinburgh. The eroded family stone lies in the north-west corner close to the elaborate Gothic Bailey vault.

Family
Rockville married Anne, daughter of William Duff and widow of William Dalrymple-Crichton, 5th Earl of Dumfries, in 1769. One of their sons was Sir William Duff-Gordon, 2nd Baronet, MP for Worcester. He died in March 1792. Lady Rockville died in 1811.

See also
Marquess of Aberdeen and Temair
Duff-Gordon baronets

References
www.thepeerage.com

1739 births
1792 deaths
Rockville
Scottish sheriffs
Younger sons of earls